École St. Patrick High School is a Catholic school in Yellowknife, Northwest Territories, Canada. It is operated by the Yellowknife Catholic School Board (YCS).

The Catholic School system was established with the erection of the first K-12 school in 1953. In 1961, a separate Catholic High School called St. Patrick High was completed. St Patrick High School burned down in 1964 but was quickly rebuilt. The two schools operated separately until 1967 when expansion of St. Patrick School allowed all grades within the same building. In the 1990s, the current St. Patrick High School was completed. The original school was demolished in 2000 and a separate elementary section was established and christened Weledeh Elementary School.

Along with English, St. Patrick's offers the French immersion program for students in grades 9–12.

See also
 List of schools in the Northwest Territories

External links
School's website
School profile at Yellowknife Catholic School Board

High schools in the Northwest Territories
Education in Yellowknife
Catholic secondary schools in the Northwest Territories